Stone Arch Bridge, Starrucca Creek was a historic stone arch bridge located at Starrucca, Wayne County, Pennsylvania.  It measured  and crossed Starrucca Creek.

It was listed on the National Register of Historic Places in 1979. It was delisted in 1986, after being demolished.

References

Former National Register of Historic Places in Pennsylvania
Bridges in Wayne County, Pennsylvania
Stone arch bridges in the United States
Road bridges in Pennsylvania